Dedensen-Gümmer is a railway station located in Dedensen and Gümmer, Germany. The station is located on the Hanover–Minden railway and the Bremen–Hanover railway. The train services are operated by Deutsche Bahn as part of the Hanover S-Bahn. Dedensen-Gümmer is served by the S1 and S2. It is in the Umland zone of Hannover. For information see http://www.gvh.de

Train services
The following services currently call at Dedensen-Gümmer:

Railway stations in Lower Saxony
Hannover S-Bahn stations